Nova Generatsia, is a Bulgarian new / cold / dark wave musical group. It was founded in 1987 by Dimiter Voev, and existed in different lineups until Voev's death in 1992 at the age of 27. During Voev's life, and especially after his death, Nova Generacia achieved cult status. Nova Generacia later appeared in Sofia on 21 June 2006 in front of 40,000 people, opening for Depeche Mode. Dimiter Voev's vocal duties were taken by younger brother Simeon Voev.

Members
 Dimitar Voev – lead vocals, bass guitar (until 1992)
 Kristiyan Kostov – guitar
 Kiril Manchev – drums
 Mihail Peshev – synthesizer
 Alina Tringova – vocals
 Lyudmil Milovanski – drums
 Dimitar Bozhidarov – guitar
 Katya Atanasova – synthesizer, vocals
 Simeon Voev – lead vocals (since 2006), guitar
 Georgi Stoilov – drums

Discography
 1987 – Вход Б (Vhod B)
 1989 – BG Rock I
 1991 – Forever
 1992 – Отвъд смъртта (Otvud smurtta)
 1998 – Завинаги ‘98 (Forever '98)

References

External links
 Nova Generacia at Bulgarian Rock Archives
 http://newgeneration-forever.net/
 http://www.myspace.com/novageneracia

Bulgarian rock music groups
Bulgarian new wave musical groups